The 2008 Plymouth City Council election was held on 1 May 2008 to elect members of Plymouth City Council in England. One third of the council was up for election and the Conservative Party remained in control of the council with an increased majority.

Overall results

|-
| colspan=2 style="text-align: right; margin-right: 1em" | Total
| style="text-align: right;" | 19
| colspan=5 |
| style="text-align: right;" | 59,328
| style="text-align: right;" | 

Note: All changes in vote share are in comparison to the corresponding 2004 election.

Ward results

Budshead

Compton

Devonport

Efford and Lipson

Eggbuckland

Ham

Honicknowle

Moor View

Peverell

Plympton Chaddlewood

Plympton Erle

Note: This Plympton Erle seat was won by Lock for the Liberal Democrats the previous time it was contested in 2004, but he defected to the Conservatives in 2007.

Plympton St Mary

Plymstock Dunstone

Plymstock Radford

St Budeax

St Peter and the Waterfront

Southway

Stoke

Sutton and Mount Gould

See also
 List of wards in Plymouth

References

2008 English local elections
May 2008 events in the United Kingdom
2008
2000s in Devon